Pietro Borsetti (March 6, 1882 – October 17, 1955) was an Italian gymnast who competed in the 1908 Summer Olympics. In 1908 he finished sixth with the Italian team in the team competition.

References

External links
 
List of Italian gymnasts
Italian Olympians BORI-BORT 

1882 births
1955 deaths
Italian male artistic gymnasts
Olympic gymnasts of Italy
Gymnasts at the 1908 Summer Olympics